Streets of Buenos Aires (Spanish:Calles de Buenos Aires) is a 1934 Argentine musical film directed by José A. Ferreyra.

Cast
 Nelly Ayllón 
 Guillermo Casali 
 Delia Elías 
 Leonor Fernández 
 Miguel Gómez Bao 
 Enrique Mazza 
 Mario Soffici
 Francisco Verding

References

Bibliography 
  Leslie Bethell. A Cultural History of Latin America: Literature, Music and the Visual Arts in the 19th and 20th Centuries. Cambridge University Press, 1998.

External links 
 

1934 films
Argentine musical films
1934 musical films
1930s Spanish-language films
Films directed by José A. Ferreyra
Films set in Buenos Aires
Argentine black-and-white films
1930s Argentine films